T8AA-FM (87.9 MHz) is a radio station broadcasting from Koror, Palau.  T8AA-FM is owned by the Government of Palau and co-owned with T8AA.  T8AA-FM calls itself the "Voice of Palau."

Koror
Radio stations in Palau